Yana Urqu (Quechua yana black, urqu mountain, "black mountain", Hispanicized spelling Yanaorjo) is a mountain in the Willkanuta mountain range in the Andes of Peru, about  high. It is situated in the Cusco Region, Quispicanchi Province, Marcapata District. Yana Urqu lies southeast of the mountain Jaqhichuwa.

References 

Mountains of Cusco Region
Mountains of Peru